Somali Labour Party is a Somali political party. Founded on 7 October 2011 in Toronto, Canada. On 11 August 2018, it was temporarily registered in the Mogadishu. The party's main headquarters are located in Hamar Weyne District.

The Somali Labor Party has been operating informally since its inception and its activities have been officially announced following the issuance of the Provisional Registration Certificate.

See also 

 Political parties in Somalia

Political parties in Somalia
Political parties established in 2011
Social democratic parties in Somalia
2011 establishments in Somalia